The Edgemere Street Bridge is a historic bridge in North Little Rock, Arkansas. It carries Edgemere Street over a small part of Lakewood Lake Number Three. It is built out of rustic, roughly squared fieldstone, that is laid in uncoursed fashion. Vertical columns project from either side of the spandrels, rising above the deck level to form a decorative parapet. It was built, along with the similar Lakeshore Drive Bridge as part of the innovative Lakewood Development project of developer Justin Matthews in the 1930s.

The bridge was listed on the National Register of Historic Places in 1990.

See also
List of bridges documented by the Historic American Engineering Record in Arkansas
List of bridges on the National Register of Historic Places in Arkansas
National Register of Historic Places listings in Pulaski County, Arkansas

References

External links

Road bridges on the National Register of Historic Places in Arkansas
Historic American Engineering Record in Arkansas
National Register of Historic Places in Pulaski County, Arkansas
Stone arch bridges in the United States
Transportation in Pulaski County, Arkansas
Buildings and structures in North Little Rock, Arkansas
Rustic architecture in Arkansas
1930s establishments in Arkansas
Bridges completed in the 1930s